Rory McEwen may refer to:

 Rory McEwen (politician) (born 1948), Australian politician
 Rory McEwen (artist) (1932–1982), Scottish artist and musician